Dermatan 4-sulfotransferase (dermatan-specific N-acetylgalactosamine 4-O-sulfotransferase, dermatan-4-sulfotransferase-1, dermatan-4-sulfotransferase 1, D4ST-1, dermatan N-acetylgalactosamine 4-O-sulfotransferase, CHST14 protein, CHST14) is an enzyme with systematic name 3'-phospho-5'-adenylyl sulfate:(dermatan)-N-acetyl-D-galactosamine 4-sulfotransferase. This enzyme catalyses the following chemical reaction

 3'-phospho-5'-adenylyl sulfate + [dermatan]-N-acetyl-D-galactosamine  adenosine 3',5'-bisphosphate + [dermatan]-4-O-sulfo-N-acetyl-D-galactosamine

The sulfation takes place at the 4-position of N-acetyl-D-galactosamine residues of dermatan.

References

External links 
 

EC 2.8.2